The Khamis Mosque (transliterated: Masǧid al-ḫamīs) is believed to be the first mosque in Bahrain, built during the era of the Umayyad caliph Umar II. According to Al Wasat journalist Kassim Hussain, other sources mention that it was built in a later era during the rule of Uyunids with one minaret. The second was built two centuries later during the rule of Usfurids.

The identical twin minarets of this ancient Islamic monument make it easily noticeable as one drives along the Shaikh Salman Road in Khamis.

History 
It is considered to be one of the oldest mosques in the region, as its foundation is believed to have been laid as early as 692 CE. An inscription found on the site, however, suggests a foundation date of sometime during the 11th century. It has since been rebuilt twice in both the 14th and 15th centuries, when the minarets were constructed. The Khamis mosque has been partially restored recently.

Structure
The present building has two main phases:
An early prayer hall with a flat roof supported by wooden columns dated to the 14th century. 
A later section of the flat roof was added, supported on arches resting on thick masonry piers (which have been dated to 1339)

Islam was propagated to Bahrain in the 7th century CE when Muhammad sent an envoy Al-Ala'a Al-Hadrami, preaching Islam to the Governor of Qatar and Bahrain at the time, Munzir ibn Sawa Al Tamimi.

Mihrab Slab
Mihrab slab was a limestone slab, in the form of a mihrab. The slab was discovered during restoration works on the mosque and is believed to have originated from the 12th century CE. Inscriptions of two verses from the Qur'an are present on the slab, Qur'anic surah XXI, verses 34–35, which are normally used on gravestones.

See also 
 List of archaeological sites in Bahrain
 List of tourist attractions in Bahrain
 History of Bahrain

References

Mosques in Manama